Robert Friend may refer to 

 Robert Friend (pilot)
 Robert Friend (poet)